Arsenamide or thiacetarsamide (trade name Caparsolate) is an arsenical.  It is a proposed chemotherapeutic agent against canine filaria and trichomonas.

References

Antiparasitic agents
Organoarsenic dithiolates
Acetic acids
Benzamides
Drugs with unknown mechanisms of action